KSOO-FM (99.1 MHz, "Kickin' Country 99.1/100.5") is a radio station with a country music format, simulcasting KIKN-FM 100.5 Salem. Licensed to Lennox, South Dakota, United States, the station serves the Sioux Falls area. The station is currently owned by Townsquare Media.

Its studios are located on Tennis Lane in Sioux Falls, while its transmitter is located near Lennox.

History
KSOO-FM signed on in August 2008, simulcasting KSOO and its news/talk format. KSOO-FM switched to ESPN Radio in April 2009. In addition to national ESPN Radio programming, "ESPN 99.1" was also home to Overtime with Jeff Thurn. "ESPN 99.1" was an affiliate of the [[Nebraska Cornhuskers Radio Network and the Green Bay Packers Radio Network.

On August 1, 2021, KSOO-FM changed their format from sports (which moved to KSOO (1000 AM)) to a simulcast of country-formatted KIKN-FM, branded as "Kickin' Country 99.1 & 100.5".

Previous logo

References

KELO TV story about Sports Buffet

External links
Kickin' Country 99.1/100.5 official website

SOO-FM
Country radio stations in the United States
Radio stations established in 2008
2008 establishments in South Dakota
Townsquare Media radio stations